No. 145 (Bomber Reconnaissance) Squadron was a Royal Canadian Air Force squadron that was active during the Second World War.  It was primarily used in an anti-submarine role and was based on the east coast of Canada and Newfoundland. The squadron flew the Lockheed Hudson and Lockheed Ventura before disbanding on 30 June 1945.

Notes

Royal Canadian Air Force squadrons (disbanded)
Military units and formations of Canada in World War II